Slievemaan at , is the 54th–highest peak in Ireland on the Arderin scale, and the 70th–highest peak on the Vandeleur-Lynam scale.  Slievemaan is situated in the southwen sector of the Wicklow Mountains range, and is part of the large massif of Lugnaquilla , Wicklow's highest mountain.   Slievemaan lies at the southern end of the Glen of Imaal.

To the west of Slievemaan is the subsidiary peak of Ballineddan Mountain , whose  prominence of  qualifies it as a Vandeleur-Lynam.


Bibliography

See also
Wicklow Way
Wicklow Round
Wicklow Mountains
Lists of mountains in Ireland
List of mountains of the British Isles by height
List of Hewitt mountains in England, Wales and Ireland

References

External links
MountainViews: The Irish Mountain Website, Slievemaan
MountainViews: Irish Online Mountain Database
The Database of British and Irish Hills , the largest database of British Isles mountains ("DoBIH")
Hill Bagging UK & Ireland, the searchable interface for the DoBIH

Mountains and hills of County Wicklow
Hewitts of Ireland
Mountains under 1000 metres